Richard Francois Nantais (born October 27, 1954) is a Canadian former professional ice hockey player. He played 63 games in the National Hockey League with the Minnesota North Stars between 1974 and 1977.

Career statistics

Regular season and playoffs

External links
 

1954 births
Living people
Canadian ice hockey left wingers
Fort Worth Texans players
Ice hockey people from Quebec
Minnesota North Stars draft picks
Minnesota North Stars players
New Haven Nighthawks players
People from Repentigny, Quebec
Quebec Remparts players
Richmond Robins players
Springfield Indians players